Wilfrido Mark McCormick Enverga  (born March 25, 1978) is a Filipino politician serving as a representative for Quezon's 1st congressional district since 2019 and previously from 2007 to 2016. He is a son of former Quezon Governor Wilfrido Enverga.

Early life and education 
Mark Enverga was born in Mauban to Wilfrido Enverga and Mary Grace McCormick. He is the only son and he has 2 other siblings. He is also the grandson of Manuel S. Enverga, a former congressman and founder of the Luzonian Colleges (now Manuel S. Enverga University Foundation).

He studied at Les Roches, where he graduated with a diploma in Hotel and Restaurant Administration in 1999. He attended at Southern New Hampshire University and graduated with a Bachelor of Applied Science in Hospitality Administration in 2001 and a post-graduate Masters of Business Administration in 2003. He took a special course on governance in Ateneo de Manila School of Government.

Political career 
Enverga ran as a representative for Quezon's 1st congressional district in 2007 and elected. He was reelected in 2010 and 2013. He served until 2016 when he was replaced by his sister Katrina. During that time, he was a member of the House of Representatives Electoral Tribunal and House Committee on Rural Development.

He was elected again in 2019 since. He also currently serves as a chairperson of the House Committee on Agriculture and Food since 2019. He was reelected in 2022. On February 6, 2023, he was named legislative caretaker of Valenzuela City's 1st district, which became vacant as a result of Rex Gatchalian's appointment as Secretary of Social Welfare and Development.

References 

Living people

1978 births
Members of the House of Representatives of the Philippines from Quezon
Nacionalista Party politicians
Nationalist People's Coalition politicians
Politicians from Quezon